Rahimabad (also Romanized as Raḩīmābād) is a village in Jayedar Rural District, in the Central District of Pol-e Dokhtar County, Lorestan Province, Iran. At the 2006 census, its population was 244, in 54 families. One of the local attractions includes the Tappeh-ye Garba Hill.

References 

Towns and villages in Pol-e Dokhtar County